William Barker (born 1857, date of death unknown) was an English cricketer. He played one first-class match for Surrey in 1882.

See also
 List of Surrey County Cricket Club players

References

External links
 

1857 births
Year of death missing
English cricketers
Surrey cricketers
Cricketers from Manchester